Bryan Spicer (born April 9, 1964) is an American film and television director. As a television director some his credits include Castle, 24, House, Heroes, CSI: Crime Scene Investigation, Hawaii Five-0, and Magnum P.I..

Paley Center for Media has preserved the first season Salute Your Shorts episode "Sponge Saga" in its New York archive, which was directed by Spicer.

In 1995, Spicer made his feature film directorial debut with the film Mighty Morphin Power Rangers: The Movie, and in 1997 he directed the films McHale's Navy and For Richer or Poorer.

References

External links

American film directors
American television directors
American television producers
Living people
Place of birth missing (living people)
1964 births